Kang Hye-won (born July 5, 1999), known mononymously as Hyewon, is a South Korean singer, rapper and actress. She is a former member of the South Korean–Japanese girl group Iz*One, formed by CJ E&M through Mnet's 2018 reality competition television show Produce 48.

Early life
Kang was born in Yangsan, South Gyeongsang, South Korea, on July 5, 1999. She attended Bokwang High School in Yangsan, then she transferred to Hanlim Multi Art School.

Career

2018: Produce 48 & debut with Iz*One

Kang was announced to be a part of Produce 48 in 2018. She finished in 8th place with 248,432 votes securing her place in Iz*One. The group made their official debut on October 29, 2018, with the song titled "La Vie en Rose", from their debut extended play Color*Iz.

2021–present: Solo activities, W, and acting debut
After Iz*One officially concluded activities on April 29, 2021, Kang returned to being a trainee under 8D Creative. On July 21, it was announced that Kang would be making her debut as an actress in the upcoming third season of web series Best Mistake, portraying character Jin Se-hee. On July 27, she made an appearance in Parc Jae-jung's "Hobby" music video. In August, Kang was confirmed as a cast member of MBC's variety show How A Family is Made.

On December 8, a teaser video was revealed on her YouTube channel, announcing the upcoming release of a winter special album, W. On December 22, she released the album with "Winter Poem" as the lead single.

On June 9, 2022, Kang released the single "Like A Diamond", featuring Stella Jang.

On July 6, PLAYLIST announced Kang as one of the casts in Seasons of Blossom a webdrama adaptation of webtoon of the same name. Kang will be portraying the role of Yoon Bo-mi.

Endorsements
On November 12, 2021, Kang landed her first CF deal with the camera app SODA, it was revealed through a video advertisement uploaded on SODA's official YouTube Channel. Kang starred as international face phishing criminal who pretended to be a detective and used the SODA app to altered her image. On December 24, through atstar1 magazine, the global sports brand New Balance announced Kang as their pictorial model for their new Backpack with the theme "MBTI Concept New Semester Backpack."

On January 13, 2022, through her own YouTube channel, Kang announced collaboration with a skincare line, Uriid, where Kang is in charge of the promotional design to promote their new product, Uriid Neroli Garden Ampoule Stick. According to Uriid, after the promotional video with Kang was released on her YouTube channel, the product is selling high on social media and online store, particularly in Hyundai Home Shopping. On May 30, Kang was chosen by the British premium bag brand, Radley London, to promote their new 2022 Spring/Summer Collection, Forest Way-Smoking (medium zip-top multi-way bag espresso), and Duke Place (medium open-top multi-way bag dark blue) bags by releasing  pictorial through atstar1 magazine with the theme 'Fun-Loving London' On June 8, a South Korean clothing brand, General Idea, announced Kang as their new muse and fashion brand model for their 2022 Summer Collection with the theme 'BLOOMY SUNDAY'. Kang continued working with General Idea as their muse for their "22FW Woman Part.2 Collection" by dropping new pictorials on September 13. On June 27, Nexon announced Kang as their advertising model for their online game, Mabinogi On July 18, Kang announced collaboration with LEGO to promote their three-dimensional reproduction of Vincent van Gogh's Starry Night by releasing pictorial with the piece through ELLE Korea. On October 6, ma:nyo, a Korean cosmetic brand, announced Kang Hyewon as their new Global Brand Ambassador.

On January 9, 2023, ROEM, a Korean clothing company, announced Kang as their 2023 Spring/Summer season campaign model by releasing pictorial for their "Wonder the NEW ROMANTIC" of the "2023 PRE-SPRING Collection" with Kang.

Discography

Single albums

Singles

Other charted songs

Composition credits
All song credits are adapted from the Korea Music Copyright Association's database unless stated otherwise.

Filmography

Web series

Television shows

Web show

Music video appearances

Bibliography

Notes

References

External links

  

1999 births
Living people
People from Yangsan
K-pop singers
Iz*One members
Produce 48 contestants
South Korean women pop singers
South Korean female idols
South Korean web series actresses
Hanlim Multi Art School alumni
Swing Entertainment artists
21st-century South Korean women singers
Reality show winners
Japanese-language singers of South Korea